Chainsmoker LP is the debut solo studio album by American rapper Monoxide Child. It was released on November 16, 2004 through Psychopathic Records in the United States and on November 29, 2004 through Method Recordings in Australia. Recording sessions took place at the Lotus Pod in Detroit. Among Monoxide, production was handled by Fritz "The Cat" Van Kosky, J-Ha and Esham. It features guest appearances from Anybody Killa, Esham, Jamie Madrox and Kash Kola.

The album peaked at number 191 on the Billboard 200, at #14 on the Independent Albums and #3 on the Heatseekers Albums in the United States.

Track listing

Personnel
Paul "Monoxide" Methric – main artist, producer (tracks: 5, 8, 10), arranger (tracks: 1, 2, 8), mixing (tracks: 1-13)
Esham Attica Smith – featured artist (track 6), producer & mixing (track 10)
James Lowery – featured artist (tracks: 11, 13)
J. "Kash Kola" Evelyn – featured artist (track 11)
Jamie "Madrox" Spaniolo – featured artist (track 13)
Chris Rouleau – additional vocals (track 5)
Emily "Sev" Elev – additional vocals (track 5)
Fritz "The Cat" Van Kosky – producer (tracks: 4-8, 10-14), arranger (tracks: 1, 2, 8), mixing
J-Ha – producer (tracks: 1, 3, 9-11), mixing (tracks: 4, 6, 10-12)
M. Scotta – design, layout

Charts

References

External links

2004 debut albums
Horrorcore albums
Albums produced by Esham
Underground hip hop albums
Psychopathic Records albums
Hip hop albums by American artists